Johannes Hubertus Petrus Josephus (Jean) den Rooijen (2 January 1866 – 12 February 1939) was a Dutch glazier.

Life and work
Den Rooijen and his younger brother Piet (1867–1913) learned the trade as glass painters at the Roermond atelier . In 1895 Den Rooijen, assisted by his brother, started his own studio. It was known as gebrs. Den Rooijen. Piet had to stop working in 1908 due to illness and died a few years later. Jean continued the business alone. Work was done in a traditional, mostly neo-Gothic style.

Jean den Rooijen died in 1939, at the age of 73. The studio was continued by his widow, until she sold it to JHM Wielders in 1951.

Works 
 Stained glass windows (1902-1924) for the Sint-Martinuskerk in Weert
 Stained glass windows (1905-1928) for the Sint-Nicolaaskerk in Edam
 Stained glass (1911-1912) for the Sint Gerlachuskerk in Banholt
 Stained glass windows (1913) in the choir of the Sint-Servatiuskerk in Westerhoven
 Stained glass windows (1927-1928) for the Sint-Lambertuskerk in Helmond
 Stained glass windows (1930) for the chapel of Klooster Opveld in Maastricht

Gallery

References

1866 births
1939 deaths
Dutch male painters
People from Roermond
Glaziers